Into the Night is a Belgian apocalyptic sci-fi drama thriller streaming television series created by Jason George, inspired by the 2015 Polish science fiction novel The Old Axolotl by Jacek Dukaj. The series premiered on Netflix on May 1, 2020. It is Netflix's first Belgian original series. On July 1, 2020, the series was renewed by Netflix for a second season. The second season premiered on September 8, 2021, while a Turkish language submarine-set spin-off, Yakamoz S-245, was released on April 20, 2022.

Premise
The first season follows a group of people whose plane is hijacked while they are on board a red-eye flight from Brussels. Terenzio (Cassetti), the hijacker, is an Italian NATO soldier. He forces his way onto the commercial aircraft and demands an early take-off. The handful of people in the aircraft now become some of the survivors from a deadly global event caused by exposure to sunlight. The plane heads west in an attempt to survive this catastrophe that kills all living organisms during daylight hours. The group – led by Mathieu (Capelluto), the pilot, and Sylvie (Pauline Étienne), a passenger – must work together to keep the sun behind them. The group must deal with fuel shortage, irradiated food, hidden agendas, and other problems in their race to reach an underground military bunker.

In the second season, the remaining survivors secure their path to a NATO bunker, where they seek refuge from the deadly rays of the sun. Continuing their quest of survival with the military members in the bunker, they attempt to manage a burgeoning conflict and find a solution to the diminished supply of resources.

Cast

Main 
Pauline Etienne as Sylvie Bridgette Dubois, a former military helicopter pilot.
Laurent Capelluto as Mathieu Daniel Douek, an airline co-pilot.
Stefano Cassetti as Terenzio Matteo Gallo, an Italian NATO officer. (season 1; guest season 2)
Mehmet Kurtuluş as Ayaz Kobanbay, a mysterious Turkish man.
Babetida Sadjo as Laura Djalo, a home health nurse. 
Jan Bijvoet as Richard "Rik" Mertens, a security guard.
Colin Stewart as Jakub Kieslowski, a mechanic.
Colin Stewart as Horst Baudin, a climate scientist.
Regina Bikkinina as Zara Oblonskaya, a Russian mother who has a sick son, Dominik.
Alba Gaïa Bellugi as Ines Mélanie Ricci, a digital influencer and internet celebrity.
Nabil Mallat as Osman Azizi, a Moroccan airport cleaner.
Nicolas Alechine as Dominik Oblonsky, the sick son of Zara.
Astrid Whettnall as Gabrielle Renoir, a flight attendant. (season 1)
Émilie Caen as Théa Bisset (season 2)
Dennis Mojen as Cpt. Markus Müller (season 2)

Others 
Borys Szyc as a Polish soldier (guest seasons 1–2).
James McElvar as Freddie D. Green, a British soldier (recurring season 1).
Edwin Thomas as Roger Waters, a British soldier (recurring season 1).
Robbie Nock as John Morris, a British soldier (recurring season 1).
Mihail Mutafov as Mr. Volkov, a patient with dementia in the care of Laura (recurring season 1).
Laura Sépul as Chlóe (recurring season 1)
Yassine Fadel as Nabil (recurring season 1)
Kıvanç Tatlıtuğ as Arman / Turkish researcher (guest season 2)

Episodes

Season 1 (2020)

Season 2 (2021)

Production

Development
On September 3, 2019, it was announced that Netflix had given the production a series order for a 6-episode first season. The series is created by Jason George who is also credited as an executive producer of the series alongside, D.J. Talbot, Tomek Baginski and Jacek Dukaj. Production companies involved with the series were slated to consist of Entre chien et loup. On July 1, 2020, the series was renewed by Netflix for a second season, which premiered on September 8, 2021.

Casting
On September 30, 2019 it was confirmed that Mehmet Kurtuluş, Astrid Whettnall, Pauline Etienne, Bebetida Sadjo, Laurent Capelluto, Alba Bellugi, Nabil Mallat, Regina Bikkinina, Vincent Londez, Jan Bijvoet, Stefano Cassetti, Ksawery Szlenkier, Yassine Fadel, Laura Sepul and Nicolas Aleshine had been cast in the series.

Release

Premiere
On April 24, 2020, Netflix released the official trailer for the series.

Spin-off
In October 2020, Netflix announced their upcoming Turkish slate to include a submarine-set limited series, described as a "fast-paced action adventure story", starring Kıvanç Tatlıtuğ, directed by Tolga Karaçelik, and written by Atasay Koç, Cansu Çoban, Sami Berat Marçalı and Jason George. Ahead of the series release, Tatlıtuğ appeared as Arman in an episode of the second season of Into the Night, revealing the in-development series to be a spin-off of Into the Night, set concurrently with the first two seasons and titled Yakamoz S-245.

Reception

Critical response
The review aggregator website Rotten Tomatoes reported an 88% approval rating for the first season with an average rating of 8.7/10, based on 18 reviews.

See also
 Inconstant Moon—a short story with a similar theme
 The Langoliers by Stephen King

References

External links

2020 Belgian television series debuts
2020s Belgian television series
2020s science fiction television series
Aviation television series
Aircraft hijackings in fiction
French-language television programming in Belgium
French-language Netflix original programming
English-language Netflix original programming
Post-apocalyptic television series
Post-apocalyptic web series
Serial drama television series
Thriller television series
Science fiction web series
Television shows about aviation accidents or incidents
Television shows based on Polish novels
Dutch-language Netflix original programming